James Gordon Parr (May 26, 1927 – April 5, 2000) was an English-Canadian academic, broadcaster and provincial civil servant in the province of Ontario, Canada.

Parr was an engineer by training specializing in metallurgy and he once hosted a programme on CBC Radio called The Mad Metallurgist aimed at popularizing the discipline. He also wrote several books on the subject including The Engineer's Guide to Steel; Man, Metals and Modern Magic and An Introduction to Stainless Steel.

He earned his B.Sc. degree in metallurgy from the University of Leeds and worked as a mining engineer before enrolling at the University of Liverpool to study his doctorate. He lectured there before coming to Canada to work for Inco in Sudbury. He returned to Canada in 1953 to work for the British Columbia Research Council and also lectured at the University of British Columbia.

In 1955, he went to the University of Alberta to accept an appointment as an associate professor and then full professor. He moved to Windsor, Ontario in 1964 to become dean of the faculty of applied science at the University of Windsor.

After serving as chairman of the Commission on Post-Secondary Education in Ontario (COPSEO) and as president of the Ontario Committee on University Affairs, Parr was appointed deputy minister of Colleges and Universities - a civil service position for the provincial government.

In addition to writing poetry, Parr composed selections for the piano and wrote operettas that were performed at the Toronto Arts & Letters Club. Two years before his untimely death, Parr produced a CD, "When Music Sounds" , consisting solely of his own songs, sung by Canadian tenor James Leatch accompanied by pianist Dona Jean Clary.

In 1979, he was appointed chairman of TVOntario during which time he unsuccessfully sought a license for the network from the Canadian Radio-television and Telecommunications Commission (CRTC) to launch a national children's channel. In 1985 he was appointed director-general of the Ontario Science Centre for a three-year term.

References

1927 births
2000 deaths
Ontario civil servants
Canadian television executives
Canadian academics in engineering
Canadian university and college faculty deans
TVO executives